Paris, France is a studio album by France Gall, released in May 1980.

Track listing

Certifications

References 

France Gall albums
Warner Records albums
1980 albums
Albums produced by Michel Berger